PP-21 Chakwal-I is a Constituency of Provincial Assembly of Punjab.

Election 2008

Election 2013

Bye-election 2018

2018—2023: PP-21 (Chakwal-I))

General elections are scheduled to be held on 25 July 2018.

See also
 PP-20 Rawalpindi-XIV
 PP-22 Chakwal-II

References

External links
 Election commission Pakistan's official website
 Awazoday.com check result
 Official Website of Government of Punjab

Constituencies of Punjab, Pakistan